Utica was an ancient Phoenician and Carthaginian  city located near the outflow of the Medjerda River into the Mediterranean, between Carthage in the south and Hippo Diarrhytus (present-day Bizerte) in the north. It is traditionally considered to be the first colony to have been founded by the Phoenicians in North Africa. After Carthage's loss to Rome in the Punic Wars, Utica was an important Roman colony for seven centuries. 

Utica no longer exists, and its remains are located in Bizerte Governorate in Tunisia – not on the coast where it once lay, but further inland because deforestation and agriculture upriver led to massive erosion and the Medjerda River silted over its original mouth.

Name
These derived from Phoenician ˁAtiq, cognate with Arabic ˁatiqah and Hebrew ˁatiq (seen in the title of God, "Ancient of Days"). These all mean "Old" and contrast the settlement with the later colony Carthage, whose own name literally meant "New Town". The latinization is a little unusual in that the Latin U more often transcribed the letter W (i.e., waw) in Punic names.

The Greeks called it Ἰτύκη.

History

Phoenician colony

Utica was founded as a port located on the trade route leading from Phoenicia to the Straits of Gibraltar and the Atlantic Ocean, facilitating trade in commodities like tin.

The exact founding date of Utica is a matter of controversy. Several classical authors date its foundation to around 1100BC. The archaeological evidence, however, suggests a foundation no earlier than the eighth centuryBC. The inland settlement used Rusucmona ("Cape Eshmun") on Cape Farina to the northeast as its chief port, although continued silting has rendered the present-day settlement at Ghar el-Melh a small farming community. Although Carthage was later founded about 40 km from Utica, records suggest "that until 540BC Utica was still maintaining political and economic autonomy in relation to its powerful Carthaginian neighbor".

Carthaginian rule
By the fourth century BC, Utica came under Punic control, but continued to exist as a privileged ally of Carthage. Soon, commercial rivalry created problems between Carthage and Utica.

This relationship between Carthage and Utica began to disintegrate after the First Punic War, with the outbreak of rebellion among mercenaries who had not received compensation for their service to Carthage. Originally, Utica refused to participate in this rebellion, so that the Libu forces led by Spendius and Matho laid siege to Utica and nearby Hippocritae.

The Carthaginian generals Hanno and Hamilcar then came to Utica's defense, managing to raise the siege, but "the severest blow of all… was the defection of Hippacritae and Utica, the only two cities in Libya which had…bravely faced the present war…indeed they never had on any occasion given the least sign of hostility to Carthage."  Eventually, the forces of Carthage proved victorious, forcing Utica and Hippacritae to surrender after a short siege.

Roman rule
Utica again defied Carthage in the Third Punic War, when it surrendered to Rome shortly before the breakout of war in 150 BC. After its victory, Rome rewarded Utica by granting it an expanse of territory stretching from Carthage to Hippo.

As a result of the war, Rome created a new province of Africa, and Utica became its capital, which meant that the governor's residence was there along with a small garrison. Over the following decades Utica also attracted Roman citizens who settled there to do business.

During the Roman Civil War between the supporters of Pompey and Caesar, the Battle of Utica (49 BC) was fought between Julius Caesar's general Gaius Scribonius Curio and Pompeian legionaries commanded by Publius Attius Varus supported by Numidian cavalry and foot soldiers]. Curio defeated the Pompeians and Numidians and drove Varus back into the town of Utica, but then withdrew. Later at the Battle of Thapsus in 46 BC the remaining Pompeians, including Cato the Younger, fled to Utica after being defeated. Caesar pursued them to Utica, meeting no resistance from the inhabitants. Cato, who was the leader of the Pompeians, ensured the escape of his fellow senators and anyone else who desired to leave, then committed suicide, unwilling to accept the clemency of Caesar.

Displaying their fondness for Cato, "the people of Utica...called Cato their saviour and benefactor... And this they continued to do even when word was brought that Caesar was approaching. They decked his body in splendid fashion, gave it an illustrious escort, and buried it near the sea, where a statue of him now stands, sword in hand".  After his death, Cato was given the name of Uticensis, due to the place of his death as well as to his public glorification and burial by the citizens of Utica.

Utica obtained the formal status of a municipium in 36 BC and its inhabitants became members of the Quirina tribe. The city was chosen by the Romans as the place where the governor of their new Africa Province was resident, but the silting of the port (because of the Medjerda River) damaged the importance of Utica.

During the reign of Augustus, however, the seat of provincial government was moved to a since rebuilt Carthage, although Utica did not lose its status as one of the foremost cities in the province. When Hadrian was emperor, Utica requested to become a full Roman colony, but this request was not granted until Septimius Severus, a native of the Province of Africa, took the throne.

The city and all the area east of the Fossatum Africae was nearly fully romanised by the time of Septimius Severus. According to historian Theodore Mommsen, all the inhabitants of Utica spoke Latin and practised Christianity in the fourth and early fifth century. The Peutinger Map from around this time shows the town.

Destruction
In 439 AD, the Vandals captured Utica. In 534 AD, the Byzantines captured it once more.  "Excavations at the site have yielded two Punic cemeteries and Roman ruins, including baths and a villa with mosaics".

Diocese of Utica
Roman Utica was a Christian city with an important diocese in Africa Proconsularis. 

Indeed, there are more than a dozen bishops documented in Utica. The first, Aurelius, intervened at the council held at Carthage in 256 AD by St. Cyprian to discuss the question of the "lapsi". Maurus, the second bishop, was accused of apostasy during the Diocletianic Persecution of 303. The third, Victorius, took part in the Council of Arles in 314 AD along with Cecilianus of Carthage; he is mentioned in the Roman Martyrology on 23 August. Then the fourth, Quietus, assisted at the Council of Carthage (349)  proclaimed by Gratus.

At the Conference of Carthage (411) which saw gathered together the bishops of Nicene Christianity and of heretical Donatism Victorius II took part for the Church and Gedudus for the Donatists. The historian Morcelli added the bishop Gallonianus, present at the Council of Carthage (419), who, according to J. Mesnage, instead belonged to the Diocese of Utina. Then the Bishop Florentius, who intervened at the Synod of Carthage (484), was met by the Vandal king Huneric, after which he was exiled.

Faustinianus participated at the Council of Carthage (525). He was followed by the bishop Giunilius, an ecclesiastical writer, who dedicated his works to Primasius of Hadrumetum. In the seventh century was the bishop Flavianus, who assisted at the Council of Carthage (646) against Monothelitism; and Potentinus, who was exiled in Spain and intervened at the Council of Toledo (684).

With the Arab conquest, Utica was destroyed and disappeared even as an independent diocese. Only during the early Renaissance Utica was again a diocese, when the Spanish Empire conquered the region for some decades and Pedro del Campo was named bishop of the recreated Diocese of Utica in 1516 AD.

Ruins
The site of the ruins of Utica is set on a low hill, composed of several Roman villas. Their walls still preserve decorative floor mosaics.

Currently, the site is located about 30 km from Tunis and 30 km from Bizerte and near cities with four other historical sites:
 Zhana: village two kilometers from the site and has some important monuments;
 Ghar El Melh : city located on a narrow strip of land between the mountains and the sea and welcoming several fortresses;
 El Alia : city which houses monuments Andalusian style;
 Metline : coastal town of Andalucian style.

The House of the Cascade at Utica is typical of most Roman houses excavated in North Africa.

Notable people

 Dionysius of Utica was an ancient Greek writer from Utica.

Gallery

See also

 Caesarea
 Cirta
 Thamugadi
 Lambaesis
 Thysdrus
 Volubilis
 Leptis Magna
 Carthago
 Utica, New York

References

Citations

Bibliography
 Chelbi, Fethi. Roland Paskoff et Pol Trousset, « La baie d'Utique et son évolution depuis l'Antiquité : une réévaluation géoarchéologique », Antiquités africaines, vol. 31, 1995, pp. 7–51
 Chelbi, Fethi. Utique la splendide, éd. Agence nationale du patrimoine, Tunis, 1996 
 Cintas, Pierre. « Nouvelles recherches à Utique », Karthago. number 5, 1954, pp. 86–155
 Colozier, Étiennette. « Quelques monuments inédits d'Utique », Mélanges d'archéologie et d'histoire, vol. 64, numéro64, 1952, pp. 67–86
 . 
 Hatto Gross, Walter. Utica. In: Der Kleine Pauly (KlP). Band 5, Stuttgart 1975, Sp. 1081 f.
 Lézine, Alexandre. Carthage-Utique. Études d'architecture et d'urbanisme, éd. CNRS, Paris, 1968
 Paskoff, Roland et al., « L'ancienne baie d'Utique : du témoignage des textes à celui des images satellitaires », Mappemonde, numéro1/1992, pp. 30–34
 Ville, G. « La maison de la mosaïque de la chasse à Utique », Karthago, numéro11, 1961–1962, pp. 17–76

External links

 
 Utica (in Italian)

Populated places established in the 8th century BC
Populated places disestablished in the 7th century
Phoenician colonies in Tunisia
Roman towns and cities in Tunisia
Carthage
Ancient Berber cities
Catholic titular sees in Africa
Ancient Greek geography of North Africa